Back When I Knew It All is the sixth studio album by the American country music duo Montgomery Gentry. It was released by Columbia Records Nashville on June 10, 2008 (see 2008 in country music). The album's lead-off single, also its title track, became their fourth Number One on the Billboard Hot Country Songs charts in July 2008, as did "Roll with Me", the second single, in December 2008. The third single "One in Every Crowd" was released in February 2009, followed by the fourth single "Long Line of Losers" on June 22, 2009.

Content 
Back When I Knew It All was produced by Blake Chancey. The album's first release to country radio was its title track, co-written by Trent Willmon. In mid-2008, this song became Montgomery Gentry's fourth Number One hit on the Billboard Hot Country Songs charts. Following it was "Roll with Me", which also topped Hot Country Songs. "One in Every Crowd" is the album's third single, released in early 2009. This song and "Now You're Talkin'" were co-written by Ira Dean, formerly bass guitarist in the group, Trick Pony. "Now You're Talkin'" and "Long Line of Losers" (the fourth single) were previously recorded by Kevin Fowler on his 2007 album Bring It On, and "The Big Revival" was previously recorded by John Anderson on his 2000 album Nobody's Got It All, which Chancey also produced.

Track listing

Personnel
 Pat Buchanan - 12-string guitar, acoustic guitar, electric guitar, harmonica, slide guitar
 Rachel Calloway - intro vocals on "The Big Revival"
 Dan Dugmore - banjo, dobro, acoustic guitar, electric guitar, lap steel guitar, mandolin, pedal steel guitar, slide guitar
 Five for Fighting - background vocals on "Roll with Me"
 Troy Gentry - lead vocals, background vocals
 David Grissom - baritone guitar, electric guitar
 Wes Hightower - background vocals
 Mark Hill - bass guitar
 Toby Keith - vocals on "I Pick My Parties"
 Chuck Leavell - Hammond organ, piano, Wurlitzer
 Eddie Montgomery - lead vocals, background vocals
 Greg Morrow - drums, percussion
 Gordon Mote - intro vocals & intro organ on "The Big Revival"
 MTSU Omega Delta Psi Recording Industry Fraternity - marching on "The Big Revival", clapping & gang vocals on "One In Every Crowd"
 Billy Panda - acoustic guitar, electric guitar, mandolin
 Lillie Mae Rische - vocals on "God Knows Who I Am"

Church Congregation on "The Big Revival": Kent Agee, Diane Akin, Jayme Calhoun-Paulk, Katie Cleek, Ryan Cook, Mel Eubanks, Missy Evans, Chris Gillis, Chris Hennessee, Teresa Pitt, Daniel Rediger, Josh Van Valkenburg, Hannah Williams, Willetta Williams

Chart performance

Weekly charts

Year-end charts

Singles

References 

 AllMusic (see infobox)

2008 albums
Montgomery Gentry albums
Columbia Records albums
Albums produced by Blake Chancey